Usi, also referred to as starch, is a starch dish of the Niger delta people of Nigeria. The starch is derived from cassava (manioca).

References

Nigerian cuisine
Starch